Aku Haus Darahmu is a 2017 Malaysian horror film directed by Aidilfitri Mohamed Yunos, starring Deanna Yusoff, Sweet Qismina and .

Cast
 Deanna Yusoff as Cempaka Sulastri
  as Lia
 Sweet Qismina as Ezza
  as Arin
 Amalia Syakirah as Kenanga

Release
The film opened in theatres on 2 February 2017.

Reception
Dennis Chua of the New Straits Times praised the performances of Yusoff, Zainal, Rahman and Syakirah, but criticised Qismina's acting, writing that she "still has a long way to go". Chua also wrote that while Yunos "delivers" on the horror aspect of the film, it "would have been much better with more solid back stories and for the characters."

Shazryn Mohd Faizal of  wrote a mixed review of the film, criticising the budget and the script.

References

External links
 

Malaysian horror films
2017 horror films